Adam Müller-Guttenbrunn (22 October 1852, in Guttenbrunn, Austria, today Zăbrani, Romania – 5 January 1923, in Vienna) was an Austrian author.

Biography
He was educated at Hermannstadt (today Sibiu, in Romania) and Vienna. In 1879, he moved to Vienna from Linz. His first success was Des Hauses Fourchambault Ende (1880), supplementing Émile Augier's drama Les Fourchambault. This was followed by Im Banne der Pflicht (1882), the comedy Schauspielerei (with Heinrich Laube, 1883), and Irma (1885). Among his novels and stories, which for the greater part appeared serially, the best-known are: Frau Dornröschen (1884; 3d ed. 1891); Gescheiterte Liebe (1889); and Die Magyarin (1896).

Notes

References

1852 births
1923 deaths
People from Arad County
People from the Kingdom of Hungary
Banat Swabians
Greater German People's Party politicians
Members of the Constituent National Assembly (Austria)
19th-century Austrian dramatists and playwrights
Austrian male dramatists and playwrights
19th-century Austrian novelists
Austrian male novelists
19th-century Austrian male writers